McKinley Belcher III (born March 23, 1984) is an American actor, known for his starring role as Samuel Diggs in the PBS television series Mercy Street, Anthony Carter in the Fox genre drama The Passage, and as Agent Trevor Evans in Netflix crime thriller Ozark.

Early life 
Belcher was born in Atlanta, Georgia on March 23, 1984 at Grady Memorial Hospital, the first son of McKinley Belcher Jr. and Pamela McGhee Belcher. The family later moved to Powder Springs, where he attended elementary and middle school. Belcher graduated from Campbell High School in Smyrna, Georgia in 2002, where he was in the International Baccalaureate program and ran track and cross country. He went to Belmont University in Nashville, Tennessee, and graduated in 2006 with a B.A. in Communication Studies and Political Science. At Belmont he competed on the Speech and Debate Team, winning awards as a debater and individual speaker. He subsequently went to USC School of Dramatic Arts in Los Angeles, where he won the Ava Greenwald Memorial Award and graduated in 2010 with an MFA in Acting.

Career

Theatre 
Belcher appeared Off-Broadway in Romeo and Juliet at Classic Stage Company in 2013 and in 2016 won a Drama Desk Award for his performance as amateur boxer Fish in the ensemble of Marco Ramirez's The Royale at Lincoln Center, directed by Rachel Chavkin. He also appeared as Sam in Darko Tresnjak's 2015 world premiere production of Rear Window at Hartford Stage, alongside Kevin Bacon. Belcher played the dual roles of Teddy and Nicholas in the world premiere of Ken Urban's A Guide for the Homesick at the Huntington Theatre Company in 2017, winning both an Elliot Norton Award for Outstanding Actor and an IRNE Award for Best Actor. In 2019 Belcher played Rashad in MCC's off-Broadway production of The Light, for which he was nominated for an Outer Critics Circle Award for Outstanding Actor in a Play. In 2020 Belcher made his Broadway debut as Private Louis Henson (a role originated by Samuel L. Jackson off-Broadway) in the Broadway premiere of A Soldier's Play at the Roundabout Theatre Company. Belcher made history as Happy Loman in the 2022-2023 Broadway production of Death of a Salesman, featuring the first African-American Loman family on Broadway alongside Wendell Pierce, Sharon D. Clarke, Khris Davis and André De Shields.

Film and television 
Belcher made his film debut in John Sayles' 2013 independent film Go for Sisters, playing Lisa Gay Hamilton's son Rodney. In 2015 he appeared in David Simon's HBO mini-series Show Me a Hero as LaTanya Richardson Jackson's son Dwayne Meeks, directed by Paul Haggis. Belcher had his first experience as a series regular as Samuel Diggs in two seasons of PBS's Ridley Scott-produced Civil War drama Mercy Street. His character, Samuel, is a free man who works as a laborer, but harbors secret knowledge and ability in medicine. In 2018 he was cast as Anthony Carter in Fox's drama The Passage, based on Justin Cronin's novel by the same name. Belcher worked with David Simon again, in HBO's 2022 limited series We Own This City, playing real-life BPD veteran and Gun Trace Task Force officer Momodu Gondo. In 2022 Belcher also joined the cast of Netflix's live-action adaptation of the Japanese manga One Piece as Arlong the Saw, a saw shark Fishman and rival to Iñaki Godoy's Luffy.

Personal life 
Belcher is openly queer, and married artist Blake Fox on January 17, 2023 in Hoboken, NJ in a wedding that was officiated by Belcher's Death of a Salesman co-star André De Shields.

Filmography

Film

Television

References

External links

Living people
American male film actors
Belmont University alumni
People from Smyrna, Georgia
USC School of Dramatic Arts alumni
1984 births
American male television actors
American male stage actors
American gay actors
LGBT African Americans
African-American male actors
Male actors from Atlanta
21st-century American male actors
21st-century African-American people
21st-century LGBT people
LGBT people from Georgia (U.S. state)